Leccinum versipelle, also known as Boletus testaceoscaber or the orange birch bolete, is a common edible mushroom (given the right preparation) in the genus Leccinum. It is found below birches from July through to November, and turns black when cooked.

Description

The cap is broadly convex, bright red-brown or brick red. It is felty and grows up to 20 cm (8 in) in diameter. The flesh is white to pink, turning green-blue when cut, particularly in the stipe. The spores are brown. The stipe is firm, long and slender, white and covered with small black scales.

Edibility
Leccinum versipelle is mildly toxic (causing nausea and vomiting) unless given proper heat treatment: frying or boiling for 15–20 minutes is considered necessary. As mentioned, the mushroom turns black when heated.

It is commonly harvested for food in Finland, Latvia, Lithuania, Estonia, Belarus, and Russia.

See also
List of Leccinum species

References

E. Garnweidner. Mushrooms and Toadstools of Britain and Europe. Collins. 1994.

versipelle
Fungi described in 1835
Fungi of Europe
Edible fungi
Taxa named by Elias Magnus Fries